Feng Kai (born 28 August 1978, in Changchun, Jilin) is a Chinese short track speed skater, who won bronze medals in the 5000 m relay at the 1998 and 2002 Winter Olympics.

External links
 
 
Feng Kai at ISU
Feng Kai at the-sports.org

1978 births
Living people
Chinese male short track speed skaters
Olympic short track speed skaters of China
Olympic bronze medalists for China
Olympic medalists in short track speed skating
Short track speed skaters at the 1998 Winter Olympics
Short track speed skaters at the 2002 Winter Olympics
Medalists at the 1998 Winter Olympics
Medalists at the 2002 Winter Olympics
Asian Games medalists in short track speed skating
Short track speed skaters at the 1999 Asian Winter Games
Medalists at the 1999 Asian Winter Games
Asian Games gold medalists for China
Asian Games silver medalists for China
Speed skaters from Changchun
20th-century Chinese people
21st-century Chinese people